César Rodriguez may refer to:

 César Atahualpa Rodríguez (1889–1972), Peruvian poet
 César Rodríguez González (1894–1962), Spanish journalist and politician
 César Rodríguez (footballer, born 1920) (1920–1995), Spanish footballer
 Cesar Rodriguez (pilot) (born 1959), American fighter pilot in the Gulf War, nicknamed the "Last American Ace"
 César Rodríguez (taekwondo) (born 1962), Mexican taekwondo practitioner
 César Rodríguez (footballer, born 1967), Peruvian footballer
 César Rodríguez Garavito (born 1971), Colombian legal scholar
 César Rodríguez Cal y Mayor (born 1969), Mexican politician
 César Rodríguez (weightlifter) (born 1973), Puerto Rican weightlifter
 César Rodríguez (racewalker) (born 1997), Peruvian racewalker

See also
 Caesar Rodriguez, comic book artist
 César Aparecido Rodrigues (born 1974), Brazilian footballer